Ouest Side (French for "West side") is the third album by French rapper Booba released on 13 February 2006 on Tallac Records, via the major Barclay Records / Universal Music Group.

History

The cover realized by Armen is inspired by a famous photograph of Malcolm X where he held a weapon while looking out a window. The name Ouest Side is a reference to the fact that Booba comes from the western suburbs of Paris, and equally for his roots in Senegal, found in the west of Africa.

Track listing

Samples
"Pitbull" contains a sample of "Mistral gagnant" by Renaud.
"Au bout des rêves" contains a sample of "Drop Leaf" Riddim.
Outro" contains a sample of "Babaji" by Supertramp, "Intro" by Lunatic & "Tallac" by Booba.

Charts

Certifications

References

External links 
 MySpace

2006 albums
Booba albums